Gammon India Limited is one of the largest civil engineering construction companies in India. Headquartered in Mumbai, it was founded in 1922 by John C. Gammon.

Notable projects
Gammon India has executed some notable civil engineering projects:
 First Project
 The first precast reinforced concrete piling job in India—construction of the foundations of the Gateway of India, Mumbai in 1919
 
 Bridge Project
 Cable-stayed bridge at Akkar, Sikkim
 Gammon have built the largest number of bridges in the Commonwealth region.
 
 Tunnel Project
 One of the longest railway tunnel in Asia for Konkan Railway at Ratnagiri, Maharashtra
 Mahatma Gandhi Setu spanning the river Ganges, between Patna and Hajipur in Bihar
 
 Building  Project
 Terminal building for Sharjah International Airport, UAE
 
 Metro Project
 Elevated viaducts for Delhi Metro Rail Corporation
 
 Nuclear Project
 India's first second-generation nuclear reactor Prototype Fast Breeder Reactor at Kalpakkam
 
 Thermal power Project
 The first 500 MW thermal power station at Trombay
 
 Flyover Project
 The then longest urban flyover at Hebbal for the Bangalore Development Authority - 5.3km
 
 Cooling Tower Project
 The tallest cooling tower at Bhusawal

Gammon India was the recipient of a performance bonus based on its delivery of the extradosed flyover ahead of the 2010 Commonwealth Games at Delhi for the Delhi Metro Rail Corporation (DMRC). Gammon India was also awarded the Signature Bridge Project award for executing a modern designed bridge and approach way for the Delhi Tourism and Transportation Development Corporation (DTTDC). This project, valued at close to Rs.10,000 million, is designed to ease traffic flow in Wazirabad, a high traffic density zone in North Delhi.

Notable accidents
 In 2007, a portion of a flyover being built by Gammon India in Panjagutta area in Hyderabad collapsed, killing 20 people.
 In 2009, a bridge being built by Gammon India for Metro rail in Delhi collapsed, killing 6 people and injuring 13.

References

Companies based in Mumbai
Construction and civil engineering companies of India
Construction and civil engineering companies established in 1922
Indian companies established in 1922
Companies listed on the National Stock Exchange of India
Companies listed on the Bombay Stock Exchange